Francis Wingfield Douglass (15 July 1875 – 20 September 1972) was a South African international rugby union player. Born in Grahamstown, he attended St. Andrew's College before playing provincial rugby for Eastern Province. He made his only Test appearance for South Africa during Great Britain's 1896 tour. He played as a forward in the 1st Test of the series, an 8–0 South Africa loss. Douglass died in 1972 at the age of 97.

References

South African rugby union players
South Africa international rugby union players
Rugby union forwards
1875 births
1972 deaths
People from Makhanda, Eastern Cape
Alumni of St. Andrew's College, Grahamstown
Rugby union players from the Eastern Cape
Eastern Province Elephants players